Lord Satanis is a fictional villain published by DC Comics who debuted in Action Comics #527 (January 1982), created by Marv Wolfman and Curt Swan.

History
Lord Satanis is a powerful sorcerer from a million years in the future. Lord Satanis battles his wife, Syrene, for Merlin's runestone. The artifact will make one of them extremely powerful and allow them to rule Earth.

Later, Lord Satanis and Syrene split Superman in half and separate the two Supermen by sending one to the distant past. After one of the Supermen is killed, Lord Satanis possesses the body and uses it to fight Syrene and Superman's other half. Superman defeats Satanis and sends Satanis and Syrene back to their own time.

See also
List of Superman enemies

References

External links
 

Characters created by Curt Swan
Characters created by Marv Wolfman
Comics characters introduced in 1982
DC Comics characters who use magic
DC Comics fantasy characters
DC Comics male supervillains
Suicide Squad members
Superman characters
Time travelers